Eskiminzin ([[Western Apache language|Ndee biyati' / Nnee biyati''']]: "Men Stand in Line for Him"; or Hashkebansiziin, Hàckíbáínzín'' - "Angry, Men Stand in Line for Him", 1828–1894) was a local group chief of the Aravaipa band of the San Carlos group of the Western Apache during the Apache Wars. Born about 1828 near the Pinal Mountains as a Pinaleño/Pinal Apache, through marriage into the Aravaipa, he became one of them and later their chief. He desired a lasting peace between the indigenous peoples of America and the whites. In 1871, Eskiminzin and the Pinaleño/Pinal band of the San Carlos Apaches under Capitán Chiquito accepted an offer by the US Government to settle down and plant crops in the vicinity of Camp Grant, a fort near modern-day Tucson, Arizona. The plan was short-lived; on April 30, 1871, a band of anti-Apache American civilians under William S. Oury, Mexican civilians under Jesús María Elías, and Tohono O'odham warriors under their chief Francisco Galerita launched a merciless assault on the tranquil settlement without warning. In the process of what became known as the Camp Grant massacre, 144 occupants (almost entirely children and women) were indiscriminately butchered and mutilated in the space of less than an hour, nearly all of them scalped. Twenty-nine children had been captured and were sold into slavery in Mexico by the Tohono O'odham and the Mexicans themselves. Eskiminzin was unfortunate enough to survive the tragedy. However, later in life he was suspected of sheltering his son-in-law the Apache Kid, was imprisoned without a trial, and soon after his release, died, a broken man, in 1894.

References
Bio Note

External links
David Leighton,"Street Smarts: Adventurous life led Oury here," Arizona Daily Star, July 23, 2013

1828 births
1894 deaths
Apache people
Native American leaders
Native American people of the Indian Wars
Native American people from Arizona